Julia Rose Lester (born January 28, 2000) is an American actress and singer. She is best known for her role as Ashlyn Caswell in the Disney+ series High School Musical: The Musical: The Series and for her portrayal of the role of Little Red Ridinghood in the 2022 Broadway revival of Into the Woods.

Early life and education
Lester is from West Hollywood, Los Angeles. She is Jewish. She is the youngest daughter of Kelly and Loren Lester, granddaughter of Helen and Peter Mark Richman, and niece of Lucas Richman. Her sisters, Jenny and Lily, are also in show business.

She attended Calabasas High School.

Filmography

Film

Television

Stage

References

External links
 

Living people
21st-century American actresses
Actresses from Los Angeles
American television actresses
Jewish American actresses
People from Woodland Hills, Los Angeles
2000 births
21st-century American Jews